Events in the year 1849 in Belgium.

Incumbents
Monarch: Leopold I
Head of government: Charles Rogier

Events

 24-26 March – Rio Nuñez incident off the West African coast
 1 May – Jean-Baptiste Malou consecrated as bishop of Bruges
 1 July – First Belgian postage stamp issued.
 28 August – Grand Steeple-Chase des Flandres first held

Publications
Periodicals
Annuaire de la noblesse de Belgique, 3.
Bulletin de l'Académie Royale de Médecine de Belgique, 9.
Bulletins de l'Académie Royale des Sciences, des Lettres et des Beaux-Arts de Belgique, 16 (Brussels, M. Hayez).

Books
 Félix Victor Goethals, Dictionnaire généalogique et héraldique des familles nobles du Royaume de Belgique.

Art and architecture
Buildings
 Saint Joseph's Church, Brussels

Paintings

 Louis Gallait, Art and Liberty
 Jacob Jacobs, Merchant Vessels off the Turkish Coast

Births
 25 March – Henri Van Dyck, painter (died 1934)
 24 May – Albert Lancaster, meteorologist (died 1908)
 31 May – Aymard d'Ursel, papal courtier (died 1939)
 8 June – Julien Dillens, sculptor (died 1904)
 10 June – Félix de Hemptinne, abbot (died 1913)
 27 September – Emile Claus, painter (died 1924)
 8 October – Alfred Verhaeren, painter (died 1924)
 28 November – Albert Thys, businessman (died 1915)
 2 December – Émile Braun, engineer (died 1927)
 20 December – Philippe Dautzenberg, biologist (died 1935)

Deaths
 15 February – Pierre François Verhulst (born 1804), mathematician
 7 May – Theodoor van Rijswijck (born 1811), writer
 31 May – Leonard du Bus de Gisignies (born 1770), soldier and politician
 27 August – Dominic Barberi (born), religious
 16 December – Maria Jacoba Ommeganck (born 1760), painter

References

 
Belgium
Years of the 19th century in Belgium
1840s in Belgium
Belgium